The county of Kent is divided into 13 districts. The districts of Kent are Ashford, Canterbury, Dartford, Dover, Folkestone and Hythe, Gravesham, Maidstone, Medway, Tonbridge and Malling, Tunbridge Wells, Sevenoaks, Swale and Thanet.

As there are 979 Grade II* listed buildings in the county they have been split into separate lists for each district.

 Grade II* listed buildings in Ashford (borough)
 Grade II* listed buildings in City of Canterbury
 Grade II* listed buildings in Dartford (borough)
 Grade II* listed buildings in Dover (district)
 Grade II* listed buildings in Folkestone and Hythe
 Grade II* listed buildings in Gravesham
 Grade II* listed buildings in Maidstone (borough)
 Grade II* listed buildings in Medway
 Grade II* listed buildings in Sevenoaks (district)
 Grade II* listed buildings in Swale
 Grade II* listed buildings in Thanet
 Grade II* listed buildings in Tonbridge and Malling
 Grade II* listed buildings in Tunbridge Wells (borough)

See also
 Grade I listed buildings in Kent

See also
  :Category:Grade II* listed buildings in Kent

References
English Heritage Images of England

 
Kent